Elaphria grata, the grateful midget moth, is a moth of the family Noctuidae. It is found in North America, where it has been recorded from Alabama, Arkansas, Connecticut, Delaware, Florida, Georgia, Illinois, Indiana, Iowa, Kansas, Kentucky, Maine, Maryland, Massachusetts, Mississippi, Missouri, New Jersey, New York, North Carolina, Ohio, Oklahoma, Ontario, Pennsylvania, South Carolina, Tennessee, Texas, Virginia, West Virginia and 
Wisconsin.

The wingspan is 20–26 mm. The forewings are reddish-brown with whitish lines. There are dark grey dots in the reniform and orbicular spots. Adults are on wing from April to October in multiple generations per year.

The larvae have been recorded feeding on forbs, Quercus species and dead leaves.

References

Moths described in 1818
Caradrinini